Copacetic may refer to:

Copacetic (Velocity Girl album), 1993
Copacetic (Knuckle Puck album), 2015